Thout 16 - Coptic Calendar - Thout 18

The seventeenth day of the Coptic month of Thout, the first month of the Coptic year. On a common year, this day corresponds to September 14, of the Julian Calendar, and September 27, of the Gregorian Calendar. This day falls in the Coptic season of Akhet, the season of inundation.

Commemorations

Feasts 
 The Feast of the Cross (Day 1)

Saints 
 The martyrdom of Saint Castor the Presbyter
 The departure of Saint Theognosta
 The departure of Saint Girgis El-Gohari

Other commemorations 
 The celebration of the Honorable Cross in the Church of the Resurrection (335 AD)

References 

Days of the Coptic calendar